Youth Sports Festival is an East German sports documentary film about the athletics competition featured at the 3rd World Festival of Youth and Students held in Berlin in 1951. It was released in 1951 and was directed by Andrew Thorndike and Dmitri Vasilyev.

External links
 

1951 films
East German films
1950s German-language films
Films directed by Andrew Thorndike
Films directed by Dmitri Vasilyev
German black-and-white films
1950s German films